"Look What You've Done" is a song by Australian rock band Jet, released on 8 March 2004 as the third international and fourth US single from their debut studio album, Get Born (2003). The single was initially issued in the United Kingdom in March before being released in Australia the following month. In the United States, it was serviced to rock radio formats in October 2004.

"Look What You've Done" is Jet's highest-charting single in Australia, peaking at number 14 on the ARIA Singles Chart. The song was ranked number 24 on Triple J's Triple J's Hottest 100 of 2004, Australia's largest annual music poll. In addition to its Australian success, "Look What You've Done" became a top-40 hit in Canada, New Zealand, the United Kingdom, and the United States.

Music videos
Two music videos were made for the song: One was of the band playing in a forest with animated creatures and a creature abducting them; the other video had band members playing in a white room, surrounded by photos of themselves.

Track listings

Australian and UK 12-inch single 
A1. "Look What You've Done"
B1. "Bruises"
B2. "Are You Gonna Be My Girl" (acoustic)

European maxi-CD single 
 "Look What You've Done"
 "Get What You Need"
 "Bruises"
 "Are You Gonna Be My Girl" (acoustic version)
 "Look What You've Done" (live)

UK CD single 
 "Look What You've Done"
 "Bruises"

UK DVD single 
 "Look What You've Done" (audio)
 "Back Door Santa" (audio)
 "Look What You've Done" (music video)
 "Get What You Need" (live from The Astoria Theatre, London) (video)
 Behind the scenes footage

Awards and nominations

APRA Awards
The APRA Awards are presented annually from 1982 by the Australasian Performing Right Association (APRA).

|-
| 2007 ||"Look What You've Done" – Nicholas Cester ||Most Performed Australian Work Overseas ||

Charts

Release history

References

2003 songs
2004 singles
Capitol Records singles
Elektra Records singles
Jet (band) songs
Song recordings produced by Dave Sardy
Songs written by Nic Cester
Rock ballads